Emperor Yingwen may refer to:

Emperor Shenzong of Western Xia (1163–1226)
Ögedei Khan ( 1186–1241)